José Daniel Octavio Guerrero Rodríguez (born 18 November 1987) is a Mexican former professional footballer who last played as a defensive midfielder for Halcones de Zapopan.

Club career

Atlante
Guerrero, a product of the Atlante youth system, debuted for the team at the age of 18 on September 9, 2006, during the 65th minute of play while sporting the number 27 jersey. Atlante, playing at their home at the time, Estadio Azteca, went on to lose 2–0 against Atlas.

With Atlante, Guerrero was champion of the Apertura 2007 tournament. 2 years later, his team also won the 2008-09 CONCACAF Champions League, thus qualifying for the 2009 FIFA Club World Cup in Abu Dhabi where Atlante would finish fourth after losing in the semifinals to eventual tournament champions FC Barcelona.

In 2010 after the sale of Federico Vilar to Morelia, Guerrero was selected as the new team captain.

After years of last or near last place finishes, following the conclusion of the Clausura 2014 Atlante was relegated to Ascenso MX, the second tier of Mexican Soccer. Due to their relegation, Guerrero was sold to Mexican giants América.

América
Due to Atlante's relegation, Guerrero was made available for the 2014 Draft and was subsequently picked up by Mexican Giants América.

International career
Guerrero played for the Mexico U-20 squad at the 2007 FIFA U-20 World Cup held in Canada.

He made his debut with the senior national team in a rained-out friendly in Puebla against Panama on 9 September 2007.

Career statistics

Club

Honours
Atlante
Mexican Primera División : Apertura 2007
CONCACAF Champions' League : 2008–09

América
Liga MX : Apertura 2014 
CONCACAF Champions League: 2014–15, 2015–16

References

External links

1987 births
Living people
Footballers from Guadalajara, Jalisco
Mexico international footballers
Mexico under-20 international footballers
Atlante F.C. footballers
Club América footballers
Club Puebla players
Dorados de Sinaloa footballers
Liga MX players
Ascenso MX players
Mexican footballers
Association football midfielders